General elections were held in Niue on 27 February 1993. Turnout was 91%.

Following the election Frank Lui was elected Premier of Niue, defeating incumbent Young Vivian 11–9. John Tofo Funaki was elected Speaker.

References

Elections in Niue
Niue
1993 in Niue
February 1993 events in Oceania